Melanie Keen (born 1967) is an arts professional and the director of the Wellcome Collection. She has worked extensively in promoting the Black Arts Movement in the UK.

Early life and education 
Keen was born in 1967 and grew up in the East End of London, her parents of Afro-Caribbean background. She studied at East Ham College of Technology in the 1980s, where she took inspiration from Sonia Boyce to pursue study of fine art. Later she achieved an MA in curating at the Royal College of Art (RCA).

Career 
Keen worked as an independent curator and consultant, supporting events and exhibitions such as the Frieze Art Fair and the Venice Biennale, also at Chelsea College of Art as a research assistant, and at Arts Council England. She joined Iniva as an assistant curator, eventually becoming Director. She was appointed Director of the Wellcome Collection in June 2019. She also sits on the advisory board of the Government Art Collection.

She has been the subject of artwork itself, sitting for Dutch photographer Carla van de Puttelaar.

In July 2022, Keen was awarded an honorary doctorate by the University of the Arts London.

Bibliography 

 Recordings: A Select Bibliography of Contemporary African, Afro-Caribbean and Asian British Art 
 out of this world: digital technology

References 

British art curators
Alumni of the Royal College of Art
1967 births
People from London
Living people
British women curators